Carlos Alberto Santibáñez (born 30 August 1986 in San Isidro) is an Argentine football midfielder who recently played for cobreloa of the Primera División B de Chile

External links

References

1986 births
Living people
Argentine footballers
Argentine expatriate footballers
Association football midfielders
Defensores de Belgrano footballers
Argentinos Juniors footballers
Santiago Morning footballers
Chilean Primera División players
Expatriate footballers in Chile
People from San Isidro, Buenos Aires
Sportspeople from Buenos Aires Province